Spallumcheen is a municipality in British Columbia. Spallumcheen may also refer to:

Spallumcheen Indian Band government, aka the Splats'in First Nations, and/or one of its reserves
Spallumcheen Valley, a name used for the area around and including Spallumcheen, Enderby and Armstrong in British Columbia
Madeline Lake, a lake in the Spallumcheen Valley formerly known as Spallumcheen Lake
Shuswap River, a river formerly known as Spallumcheen River

See also
Spillimacheen